Pinehurst may refer to:

Place names

Canada
 Pinehurst, Nova Scotia, village located outside New Germany
 Pinehurst Lake, lake in northeastern Alberta

South Africa
 Pinehurst, Western Cape, home belonging to an 'Ostrich Baron'
 Pinehurst, Durbanville, a residential estate in Durbanville, Western Cape.

United States
 Pinehurst, California
 Pinehurst, Georgia
 Pinehurst, Idaho
 Pinehurst, Massachusetts
 Pinehurst, North Carolina, a village in Moore County
 Pinehurst Resort, golf resort
 Pinehurst Race Track, race track complex
 Pinehurst, Ohio
 Pinehurst, Oregon
Pinehurst State Airport
 Pinehurst, Montgomery County, Texas
 Pinehurst, Orange County, Texas
 Pinehurst, Seattle, Washington

Other
 Pinehurst School, school in Auckland, New Zealand
 Pinehurst F.C., a former association football team from England
 Pinehurst System, a pairs playing format in golf